Kongunattu Thangam is a 1961 Indian Tamil-language action adventure film directed by M. A. Thirumugam and produced by Sandow M. M. A. Chinnappa Thevar. The film stars M. R. Radha, C. L. Anandan and Pushpalatha. It was released on 14 April 1961.

Plot 

Kongunattu Thangam is the story of a young woman named Thangam and her boy friend Rajavel rescuing Muthurathina Boopathy, Zamindar of Kongu Naadu, from the clutches of his concubine Amutha and uniting the Zamindar with his wife.

Cast 

Male cast
M. R. Radha
C. L. Anandan
Sandow M. M. A. Chinnappa Thevar
Kuladeivam Rajagopal

Female cast
Pushpalatha
Pandari Bai
Tambaram Lalitha
Thilakam R. Rajakumari

Support cast
Iqbal – Dilip (Horse)
Benny (Dog)

Dance
Lakshmirajyam
Kalaimathi Devi

Production 
After producing Thaikkupin Tharam in 1956, there was a misunderstanding between M. G. R. and Devar who were good friends from the very beginning. Devar produced some films without MGR. However, both united in 1961 and Devar produced Thaai Sollai Thattadhe with MGR. Kongunattu Thangam is the last of the series Devar produced without MGR.

Unlike other Tamil films of the day, this film focussed on the heroine than on the hero. A remarkable aspect of this film is Devar's use of a horse and a dog almost as main characters in the story. It would appear that the hero and heroine would not have achieved their goal without the help of the horse and the dog.

Soundtrack 
Music was composed by K. V. Mahadevan and the lyrics were penned by A. Maruthakasi, Alangudi Somu, Puratchidasan and Kovai Kumaradevan.

References

External links 
 

1960s action adventure films
1960s Tamil-language films
Films directed by M. A. Thirumugam
Films scored by K. V. Mahadevan
Indian action adventure films
Indian swashbuckler films